"The Saint" Alan Tabern (born 29 September 1966) is an English darts player who plays in events of the Professional Darts Corporation (PDC).

Darts career
A left-hander, Tabern made his PDC World Championship debut in 2006 with a surprising win over Alex Roy. He was beaten in the second round by Mark Dudbridge. Tabern reached the quarter-finals of the 2007 PDC World Darts Championship, where he was beaten 0–5 by eventual winner Raymond van Barneveld. In the 2008 World Championship, Tabern defeated Denmark's Per Laursen and Andy Jenkins, before losing 3–4 in the third round to Phil Taylor. Tabern caused a major shock in the 2008 Las Vegas Desert Classic by beating No. 2 seed and reigning champion van Barneveld 8–4 in the second round. In the 2008 World Matchplay, Tabern reached the quarter-finals, knocking out current World Champion John Part before losing to Dennis Priestley.

Following this great run of form, Tabern attracted a new sponsor in Target Darts. In August 2008, he claimed his second PDC Pro Tour victory in the Peach Tree Open in Atlanta, Georgia, by defeating Andy Hamilton 3–1 in the final, and the next month Tabern claimed another Players Championship win in Wales. This put him in the top 10 in the PDC Order of Merit for the first time in his career. He played in the 2008 Grand Slam of Darts, where he was involved in the first televised nine-dart shootout after he and Hamilton had finished level on points and leg difference in their group. Tabern lost 265–169 in it, with only one of his nine darts hitting treble 20, with three others in either five or one beds, contrasting with Hamilton's four treble 20s from six darts.

Tabern suffered a second round exit in the 2009 PDC World Championship, losing to Co Stompé.
The following year, he suffered another second round defeat, this time losing 3–4 to Mark Dudbridge, having missed six darts to win. Tabern once again missed six match-darts in the second round of the 2011 tournament against Mark Walsh.

On the second day of 2018 Q School in Wigan, Tabern managed to regain his tour card for 2018–2019 after beting Steven Kirkby 5–1 in the final.

World Championship results

PDC

2006: 2nd round (lost to Mark Dudbridge 0–4)
2007: Quarter-final (lost to Raymond van Barneveld 0–5)
2008: 3rd round (lost to Phil Taylor 3–4)
2009: 2nd round (lost to Co Stompé 1–4)
2010: 2nd round (lost to Mark Dudbridge 3–4)
2011: 2nd round (lost to Mark Walsh 3–4)
2012: 2nd round (lost to Paul Nicholson 0–4)
2019: 2nd round (lost to Michael van Gerwen 1–3)

Performance timeline

References

External links

Living people
1966 births
Sportspeople from St Helens, Merseyside
English darts players
Professional Darts Corporation former tour card holders
British Darts Organisation players
PDC ranking title winners